Bar Juchne or Bar-Yuchnei is a colossal legendary bird from Jewish mythology which was believed to have a wingspan large enough to block out the sun.

The Talmud tells of a Bar Juchne egg falling from its nest and destroying 300 cedars and flooding 60 villages/cities. After questioning how the egg could have fallen, if the Bar Juchne normally lays its eggs on the ground, the Talmud answers that the bird threw this particular egg to the ground because it was unfertilized.

The Talmud raises the possibility that food impurity should only apply to a volume of food equal to the Bar Juchne's gigantic egg, before deciding that the relevant volume is rather that of a chicken egg.

It is said that it would be roasted, along with Leviathan and Behemoth, and served at a banquet for the Children of Israel at the coming of the Messiah.

See also
Anqa
Behemoth
Leviathan
Roc
Thunderbird
Zig
Ziz

References

External links
www.unknownexplorers.com
LX

Legendary birds
Jewish legendary creatures